1969 Miles Festiva De Juan Pins is a live album by Miles Davis recorded at the jazz festival in La Pinède, Juan-les-Pins, Antibes, France, as an ORTF radio broadcast.

Featuring saxophonist Wayne Shorter, pianist Chick Corea, bassist Dave Holland, and drummer Jack DeJohnette, this line-up became known as "The Miles Davis Lost Quintet" as it did not record in the studio in this configuration.

It performed twice at the Juan-les-Pins Festival, July 25 and 26. Columbia Records recorded both shows, but the music would not be released in its entirety until 2013. Music from this CD, which was recorded at the July 25 concert, and from the July 26 performance was included in the 2013 box set Live in Europe 1969: The Bootleg Series Vol. 2.

Track listing (CD)

Personnel 
Musicians
 Miles Davis – trumpet
 Wayne Shorter – soprano saxophone, tenor saxophone
 Chick Corea – electric piano
 Dave Holland – bass
 Jack DeJohnette – drums

Production
 Teo Macero – producer
 Moto Uehara – product manager
 Koshin Satoh – artwork
 Hozumi Nakadaira – photography

References

Miles Davis live albums
1993 live albums
Live instrumental albums
Sony Music live albums
Albums produced by Teo Macero
Albums recorded at Jazz à Juan